Air Vice Marshal Robert John Honey,  is a former senior commander in the Royal Air Force. He served as Air Secretary from 1989 until his retirement in 1994.

RAF career
Honey was commissioned as an Acting Pilot Officer in the General Duties branch in January 1955. He was promoted to flight lieutenant in 1961, and eventually became Officer Commanding of No. 228 OCU in 1971 and then later Station Commander of RAF Coltishall in 1976. He was appointed Senior Air Staff Officer at Headquarters No. 1 Group in 1984 and Deputy Commander of RAF Germany in 1987. He succeeded Air Vice Marshal Tony Mason as Air Secretary on 10 February 1989, before retiring in 1994.

Later life
In retirement, Honey became Worcestershire County President of the Royal British Legion.

References

Living people
Royal Air Force air marshals
Companions of the Order of the Bath
Commanders of the Order of the British Empire
Year of birth missing (living people)